Olena Kiseolar is a Ukrainian Paralympic powerlifter. She represented Ukraine at the 2004 Summer Paralympics held in Athens, Greece and she won the bronze medal in the women's 48 kg event.

References

External links 
 

Living people
Year of birth missing (living people)
Place of birth missing (living people)
Powerlifters at the 2004 Summer Paralympics
Medalists at the 2004 Summer Paralympics
Paralympic bronze medalists for Ukraine
Paralympic medalists in powerlifting
Paralympic powerlifters of Ukraine
21st-century Ukrainian people